The 1981–82 season saw the merge of both the Saudi Premier League and the Saudi First Division of concern for the 1982 FIFA World Cup qualification process.

Twenty teams were divided onto two groups, A and B.

The top two in each group would enter a semi-final phase to determine the overall champions.

The top five from each group would also create the makeup for the next season's Premier League ten. The bottom five on the other hand would be entered into the Saudi First Division.

Stadia and locations

League table

Group A

Group B

Championship playoff

Semifinals

Third place match

Final

External links 
 RSSSF Stats
 Saudi Arabia Football Federation
 Saudi League Statistics
 Article writer for Saleh Al-Hoireny - Al-Jazirah newspaper 03-09-2010

Saudi Premier League seasons
Saudi Professional League
Professional League